The Petita River is a river of the Pará state in north–central Brazil.

See also
List of rivers of Pará

References
Brazilian Ministry of Transport

Rivers of Pará